PEC  may refer to:

Groups, organizations, companies
 Pakistan Engineering Council
 Pedernales Electric Cooperative
 Priesthood Executive Committee, a former organization of The Church of Jesus Christ of Latter-day Saints
 Private Equity Council
 Punjab Examination Commission, Pakistan
 Puntland Electoral Commission, Somalia

Schools
 Pokhara Engineering College, a technical college in Nepal
 Pondicherry Engineering College, India
 Punjab Engineering College, Chandigarh, India

Science, technology, engineering, medicine
 Packet Error Checking, a CRC-8 checksum for SMBus communication
 PEC (cable system) or Pan European Crossing, a European fibre optic network
 Perfect electric conductor
 Peripheral Event Controller, an implementation of autonomous peripheral operations in microcontrollers
 Perivascular epithelioid cell tumour (PEC tumour)
 Planetary Exploration of China, a Solar System space exploration program from China
 Posta Elettronica Certificata, a certified email protocol used in Italy

Other uses
 Plain English Campaign
 Pelican Seaplane Base, an airport in Alaska with IATA code PEC

See also

 
 Pec (disambiguation)
 Peck (disambiguation)
 Pek (disambiguation)
 PEK (disambiguation)
 PEQ (disambiguation)
 Peque (disambiguation)